Gosławice  is a village in the administrative district of Gmina Kodrąb, within Radomsko County, Łódź Voivodeship, in central Poland.

References

Villages in Radomsko County